Cheslyn Jampies (born 29 January 1990) is a South African soccer player who plays as a left-back for TTM.

Club career
Jampies was born in Cape Town. He started his senior career at Santos, before joining Jomo Cosmos at the beginning of the 2015–16 season.

In July 2016, he signed for Bloemfontein Celtic, but he was released by the club in November 2016 after breaching the club's code of conduct.

He signed for Richards Bay in October 2017 following a trial period at the club. He made 4 league appearances at the club before being released at the end of the season.

After spending the first half of the 2018–19 season at Steenberg United, he signed with Uthongathi in January 2019 on an 18-month contract.

He signed with Baroka on a three-year contract in September 2020.

In summer 2021, he signed for newly promoted Premier Division club Sekhukhune United.

International career
He was called up to the South Africa national football team in March 2016, but is yet to play for the national side.

Style of play
He plays as a left-back.

References

1990 births
Living people
South African soccer players
Soccer players from Cape Town
Association football fullbacks
Santos F.C. (South Africa) players
Jomo Cosmos F.C. players
Bloemfontein Celtic F.C. players
Richards Bay F.C. players
Steenberg United F.C. players
Uthongathi F.C. players
Baroka F.C. players
Sekhukhune United F.C. players
Tshakhuma Tsha Madzivhandila F.C. players
South African Premier Division players
National First Division players